James Morris (born July 5, 1952) is an American retired professional wrestler and current radio host, better known by his ring name, Hillbilly Jim. He is best known for his appearances with the World Wrestling Federation (WWF) from 1984 to 1991, and in the series Hillbilly Moments.

Professional wrestling career

Early career (1975–1984)
Before appearing in the WWF (now WWE) as Hillbilly Jim, Morris wrestled with the Continental Wrestling Association (CWA) in the Memphis area under the name "Harley Davidson", a biker gimmick. While there, Morris formed a popular tag team with Roger Smith, who went by the ring name "Dirty Rhodes" because of his resemblance to Dusty Rhodes.

World Wrestling Federation (1984–1990)
In late 1984, Morris first appeared in the WWF as a wrestling fan known as "Big Jim" who routinely sat in the front row of live events and who eventually decided to try his hand at wrestling himself. After appearing as a guest on Piper's Pit, Rowdy Roddy Piper offered his services to train him, though he eventually chose to be "trained"' by WWF Heavyweight Champion Hulk Hogan instead of the heel Piper. A series of vignettes were aired on WWF's TV programming in the early weeks of 1985, showing Hogan training Jim and providing him with his first set of wrestling boots. This introduced the character of Hillbilly Jim; a simple-minded, shaggy-bearded Appalachian hillbilly clad in bib overalls, and hailing from Mud Lick, Kentucky. Hillbilly Jim appeared in a few tag team matches with friend Hulk Hogan and had his first high-profile singles match at The War to Settle the Score event on February 18, 1985 in which he defeated Rene Goulet. However, Morris was sidelined by an injury a few days later. At a show in San Diego, he appeared in Hogan's corner in a match between Hogan and Brutus Beefcake. While chasing Beefcake's manager Johnny V around ringside, Morris slipped on a wet spot and injured his knee. To help fill in the six months during his recovery, similarly dressed "family" members Uncle Elmer, Cousin Luke, and Cousin Junior were introduced for Morris to accompany to ringside as a manager. 

When his in-ring career resumed, Morris often either tag teamed with his family, or fellow big man André the Giant. He was traditionally matched up against the WWF's monster heels of the era, such as Big John Studd and King Kong Bundy. He also had a short feud with Mr. Fuji and wrestled him in a series of tuxedo matches in late 1986. Hillbilly Jim was generally kept as a "fun" character, rarely getting involved in any serious storylines. His theme music was a folksy barn dance tune called "Don't Go Messin' With a Country Boy", which Morris danced along to with his partners, the ring announcer and/or children from the crowd while the audience clapped along. His first WrestleMania appearance was at Wrestlemania 2 as part of the open invitational battle royal.  His next Wrestlemania appearance was a novelty match in WrestleMania III involving King Kong Bundy and midget wrestlers. At Survivor Series '88, Jim teamed with his old mentor Hulk Hogan along with Randy Savage, Hercules and Koko B. Ware to defeat the team of Big Boss Man, Akeem, Ted DiBiase, King Haku and The Red Rooster. Though Jim was eliminated by Akeem, Hogan and Savage would go on to survive and win the match.

Hillbilly Jim also worked as a fill-in for wrestlers who did not appear or who had left the company. John Studd had departed the WWF while in the midst of a major feud with Andre the Giant and Jim was called upon to fill Studd's role. On June 10, 1989 at the Nassau Coliseum Jim scored a huge upset over Andre the Giant defeating him by disqualification. Hillbilly Jim continued to appear regularly in WWF matches until the summer of 1990, getting wins over Haku, Boris Zhukov, Brooklyn Brawler, and "Playboy" Buddy Rose. His last high-profile match with the WWF was during the April 28, 1990 (taped April 23, 1990) edition of Saturday Night's Main Event XXVI, in which he lost to Earthquake in a squash match that lasted just under 2 minutes. His final match was on August 31, 1990 with a win against Black Bart in Cedar Rapids, IA. In 1992, Hillbilly Jim  returned to the WWF as one of the final hosts of WWF Prime Time Wrestling alongside Vince McMahon, Jim Duggan, Bobby Heenan, Mr. Perfect, Sgt. Slaughter and many more until the final episode of Prime Time Wrestling in January 1993.

Later career (1990–present)

He returned in December 1995 as a guest referee and a month later became manager of Henry O. and Phineas I. Godwinn, "cousins" who were pig farmers, leading them to the WWF Tag Team Championship. After the Godwinns turned heel in the spring of 1997, Hillbilly Jim was no longer needed as their manager. Morris later worked as a road agent and participated in the "Gimmick Battle Royal" in 2001 at WrestleMania X-Seven, where he eliminated Jim Cornette and Sgt. Slaughter, but was last eliminated himself by The Iron Sheik. He was the official WWE legend host of the highly successful WrestleMania Axxess tour for WrestleMania XX, WrestleMania 21, WrestleMania 22, and WrestleMania 23 in major malls across the US. As part of the WrestleMania 20 Fan Axxess Tour, Jim performed at the "House of Blues" in Los Angeles, Chicago, and New Orleans sponsored by Gibson Guitars. From 1990 to 2001 Morris traveled worldwide representing the WWF for Coliseum Video sales and later with Sony Videos. In 2005, Sirius Satellite Radio added Hillbilly Jim's Moonshine Matinee as a weekly program on its Outlaw Country channel 60. Every Saturday, Morris plays a wide variety of classic country music and Southern rock. Between records, he tells stories of his days with the WWF. On April 10, 2012, Hillbilly Jim made an appearance on WWE SmackDown: Blast from the Past. Hillbilly Jim was officially inducted into the WWE Hall Of Fame on April 6, 2018.

Other media
Morris has appeared in a number of trade shows, such as Atlanta Super Sports Show, Video Software Dealer's Association, Focus on Video, and many others. Moreover, he has had numerous personal appearances in national retail stores, such as Blockbuster Video, Wal-Mart, Kmart, Toys "R" Us, and Kroger. He has done a national commercial for Chevy trucks and another local TV and radio commercials in Kentucky. He appeared in WWE cartoon series Hulk Hogan's Rock 'n' Wrestling, which was produced by DIC Enterprises. He is featured in the game WWE SmackDown! Here Comes the Pain and is billed as a legend.

He performed the song "Don't Go Messing With A Country Boy" for The Wrestling Album, which was certified gold. Its follow-up album, Piledriver - The Wrestling Album 2, also included a duet by Hillbilly Jim and a female singer credited as Gertrude, entitled "Waking Up Alone". On August 31, 2009, Hillbilly Jim appeared on ESPN's fantasy football podcast "Fantasy Focus" with Nate Ravitz and fill-in host Keith Lipscomb. Matthew Berry, one of the show's regular co-hosts, was absent due to a fantasy football draft in Las Vegas. He appeared in WWE Legends' House, which aired on the WWE Network in 2014. Morris released his book, Hillbilly Jim: The Incredible Story of a Wrestling Superstar, on October 10, 2016. After retiring from wrestling, Morris began working for a coin, currency, and stamp dealership called Champion Stamp Company Inc. He is known as a "staple" at coin and currency shows, but is largely there as a spokesman rather than for his expertise in numismatics, although he does collect some paper money and coins himself.

Championships and accomplishments
Pro Wrestling Illustrated
PWI ranked him No. 298 of the 500 best singles wrestlers during the "PWI Years" in 2003.

WWE

WWE Hall of Fame (Class of 2018)

References

External links 
 
 
 

1952 births
20th-century professional wrestlers
American color commentators
American male professional wrestlers
Fictional hillbillies
Living people
Professional wrestlers from Kentucky
Professional wrestling managers and valets
Sportspeople from Louisville, Kentucky
Stampede Wrestling alumni
WWE Hall of Fame inductees